Oritoniscus flavus is a species of woodlouse from the family Trichoniscidae, which can be found in Ireland and Wales, and also in eastern Scotland where it was recently discovered. It is a dark purple or maroon colour, and can thus be told apart from the paler Trichoniscus pusillus. It has a wide head and a tapering body, producing a shape reminiscent of a trilobite.

References

Woodlice of Europe
Crustaceans described in 1906